Danskin may refer to:

 Bob Danskin, an English footballer
 Charlie Danskin (1893–1968), English footballer
 David Danskin (1863–1948), a Scottish mechanical engineer and footballer
 Danskin's theorem, a mathematical theorem in convex analysis
 Danskin, a women's clothing brand owned by Iconix Brand Group
 Danskin Triathlon, a women's only triathlon
 Danskin Power Plant, a gas-fired power plant owned and operated by Idaho Power near Mountain Home, Idaho, USA.